Penarth Town Council is an elected community council serving the town of Penarth in the Vale of Glamorgan, Wales.

Background

Penarth has had a council of one form or another since the 1890s. Penarth Town Council came into existence in 1974 at the same time as local government reorganisation.

Town councillors represent Penarth's views on various committees and to wider public bodies. It gives out awards and grants. The council is responsible for Penarth Cemetery (which was originally acquired by Penarth Urban District Council in 1903) and the town allotments.

The council also manages three important buildings in the town, namely West House (the council headquarters), The Paget Rooms (a theatre in the town centre) and The Kymin (a Georgian house near the seafront). West House was purchased from Vale of Glamorgan Council for £100,000 and is the location for the council chamber (where council meetings are held), a Register Office (for births and deaths) and is a licensed wedding venue.

Representation

Sixteen councillors are elected from the four electoral wards in the town, namely: Cornerswell (4), Plymouth (4), St Augustine's (5) and Stanwell (3). In 2017 eleven of the seats were won by the Labour Party and five by the Conservatives.

In January 2018 the council supported recommendations that five senior councillors would receive an allowance of £500 per year.

Mayor
The council elects a town mayor and deputy mayor annually.

Council composition
Following the election on 4 May 2017 Labour were the largest party. The Conservatives increased their numbers from four to five, winning back a seat from Labour for the St Augustine's ward. Candidates also stood for Plaid Cymru, the Liberal Democrats, the Green Party and Penarth First Independents, though these other parties didn't win any seats. Stanwell councillor Janice Birch, who'd first been elected in 1975, stood down at this election.

References

Community councils of Wales
Penarth
Politics of the Vale of Glamorgan
1974 establishments in Wales